Xfire may refer to:

 Xfire, instant messaging service targeted toward gamers, and also game server browser
 Codehaus XFire, web services framework
 X-Fire (game show), British television programme

See also
 Crossfire, Xfire is an abbreviation of